Paniestichus subsolianus is a species of beetle in the family Carabidae, the only species in the genus Paniestichus.

References

Pterostichinae